The 1977 Summer Universiade, also known as the IX Summer Universiade or World University Games, took place in Sofia, Bulgaria.

Sports

Medal table

References
 Athletics
 World Student Games (Universiade - Men) - GBR Athletics
 World Student Games (Universiade - Women) - GBR Athletics
 Basketball
 USAB - NINTH WORLD UNIVERSITY GAMES (Men)
 USAB - NINTH WORLD UNIVERSITY GAMES (Women)
 Diving
 
 
 

 
1977
Universiade
Universiade
Universiade
Multi-sport events in Bulgaria
Sports competitions in Sofia
1970s in Sofia
Summer Universiade